The Upper Yoder Township Authority was formed under the terms of the Municipality Authorities Act of 1945, to provide a sewage collection system in the township. UYTA received its charter from the Commonwealth on June 21, 1955.

Construction of the Collection System
The original sanitary sewer system was constructed in three project phases  in the early 1950s through the latter part of the 1960s  throughout Upper Yoder Township. The collected waste water is treated  at the Dornick Point Sewage Treatment Plant on the Western edge of Johnstown city limits.

Sewage Authority
The authority board members are elected to five-year terms, all the terms are staggered so there is never an inexperienced authority board of directors

System Fees
As of 2009, a tap-in fee to the sanitary sewer system cost $1,200.00 with an inspection fee of $50.00. Customers pay monthly or quarterly fees to the UTYA for transporting waste to the plant at Dornick Point, as well as to the Johnstown Regional Sewage for treatment of waste.

See also
 List of municipal authorities in Cambria County, Pennsylvania
 Johnstown Redevelopment Authority

References

Cambria County, Pennsylvania